The 1938–39 Hovedserien season was the fifth season of ice hockey in Norway. Eight teams participated in the league, and Grane won the championship.

First round

West Group

East Group

Final 
 Grane - Hasle-Løren Idrettslag 1:0

External links 
 Norwegian Ice Hockey Federation

Nor
GET-ligaen seasons
1938–39 in Norwegian ice hockey